The flag of Flanders, called the Vlaamse Leeuw ("Flemish Lion") or leeuwenvlag ("Lion flag"), is the flag of the Flemish Community and Flemish Region in Belgium. The flag was officially adopted by the Cultural Council for the Dutch Cultural Community (Cultuurraad voor de Nederlandse Cultuurgemeenschap) in 1973, and later, in 1985, by its successor, the Flemish Parliament. In 1990, the coat of arms was also adopted as an official symbol.

The flag of Flanders is described as Or, a lion rampant armed and langued Gules.

Variants

See also
 Coat of arms of Flanders
 List of Belgian flags
 Flag of Belgium
 Flag of Wallonia
 Flag of the Brussels-Capital Region

References

Flanders
Flanders
Flanders
Flanders